Dendroseris pinnata is a species of flowering plant in the family Asteraceae.
It is found only in the Juan Fernández Islands of Chile.
It is threatened by habitat loss.

References

pinnata
Flora of Chile
Critically endangered plants
Taxonomy articles created by Polbot